FC Traktor Minsk is a football team from Belarus.

History
It was established in 1947 during building of Minsk Tractor Works as a sport section for construction workers and later for local factory personal. The club won Belarusian SSR League in 1948 and 1949. From 1949 till 1957 they were known as Torpedo-MTZ Minsk and from 1958 till early 1960s as MTZ Minsk. Until 1991 the club played at the top or second level of Belarusian SSR league, and from 1992 till 2001 in lower Belarusian leagues.

In 2002 Traktor Minsk merged with Trudovye Rezervy-RIPO Minsk to create MTZ-RIPO Minsk. It was refounded in 2015 and currently plays in Belarusian Second League.

Performance history

References

External links
MTZ-RIPO Minsk supporters website
RSSSF – Belarus: Championships before Independence
Profile at footballfacts.ru

Association football clubs established in 1947
Association football clubs disestablished in 2002
Defunct football clubs in Belarus
FC Partizan Minsk
Football clubs in Minsk
1947 establishments in Belarus
2002 disestablishments in Belarus
Works association football teams